Dr. William S. Alexander House, in Oxford, Ohio, was built in 1869 and was listed on the National Register of Historic Places in 1987.

The house was recognized as a good example of an I-house with transitional Greek Revival and Italianate elements.  It has an unusual two-style side portico.

It is also significant for association with two doctors, Dr. Herschel Hinkley and Dr. William S. Alexander, who assisted the town in days before hospitals and clinics were available, while also serving at Miami University, and represent "town-gown" relations in a good way.

The house was later used as a bed and breakfast, and in 2010 it was in use as a Japanese restaurant.

References

Houses on the National Register of Historic Places in Ohio
Alexander, William
National Register of Historic Places in Butler County, Ohio